Kenneth Cortsen (born 25 April 1976) is a Danish sport management researcher from Aarhus School of Business, Aarhus University and Associate Professor from University College of Northern Denmark (UCN), Department of Sport Management. His work places research at the heart of commercialization of sports.

Career
Via his position at UCN, Cortsen has helped develop and implement the first professional bachelor's degree in sport management in Denmark as well as other educational and research activities related to sport economics, sport management, and sport marketing. This includes collaboration with various sport organizations and personalities in Denmark and abroad, which has provided a better framework for sport management research in Denmark.

As a Ph.D. student linked to Centre for Corporate Communication  at Aarhus School of Business, Aarhus University, Cortsen's research focuses on the intersection between sport marketing, sport economics, and sport management and involves collaboration with several important actors connected to the sports industry, ranging from corporations, sport organizations and athletes - including Carlsberg, Hummel, NFL, DIF, DBU, Annika Sörenstam, Brandi Chastain etc. These research initiatives have facilitated an in-depth understanding of important commercial mechanisms in sports and has coined the term hybrid sports branding. His research also encompasses strategic CSR in sports and commercial business models in sports seen from an economic brand perspective. As a result of his research, Cortsen has travelled across international research environments, including research visits or research collaboration at the University of San Francisco, Harvard Business School and University of Northern Colorado. Based on his knowledge and expertise, Cortsen contributes with comments in different media's coverage of commercial problem areas in Danish and International sport. Cortsen has also conducted reviews of academic work for the European Association of Sport Management  and for Sport, Business, Management - an international journal.

References

External links
http://kennethcortsen.com
https://web.archive.org/web/20131229005819/http://bcom.au.dk/research/academicareas/ccc/press/
https://archive.today/20130212222113/http://www.ucn.dk/Forside/VTO/Videncenter_for_Turisme_og_Oplevelsesindustri/Litteratur/VTO_artikler.aspx
http://www.ucnorth.dk/Home/Programmes-Courses/Sport_Management/Programme_staff.aspx

Academic staff of Aarhus University
Living people
1976 births